Foreign relations exist between Armenia and Switzerland. Switzerland recognized Armenia as an independent state on 23 December 1991.  The two countries have maintained diplomatic relations ever since.  The Armenian ambassador to Switzerland and the Swiss ambassador to Armenia (based in Tbilisi, Georgia) were both accredited in 2002. In 2011 the first resident Ambassador of Switzerland started his mission in Yerevan. The Armenian ambassador to Switzerland is based in Geneva, in the Armenian representation to the United Nations. The Geneva Parliament  recognized the Armenian genocide in 2001 and the Swiss Federal Parliament recognized the genocide in 2003. While Swiss law made it a crime to deny the Armenian genocide, punishable by a monetary penalty, the European Court of Human Rights ruled in 2015 that a Turkish politician's conviction of the law violated his right to freedom of speech.

As of November 2019, between 4,000 and 6,000 people of Armenian descent live in Switzerland, while far fewer Swiss citizens reside in Armenia.

Armenia and Armenians often got financial and humanitarian help from Switzerland or the Swiss after big catastrophes, like the 1988 Spitak earthquake.

See also 
 Foreign relations of Armenia 
 Foreign relations of Switzerland
 Armenians in Switzerland
 Recognition of the Armenian genocide

References

External links 
 Swiss Federal Department of Foreign Affairs about relations with Armenia

 
Switzerland 
Bilateral relations of Switzerland